The Ambassador of Malaysia to the Federal Democratic Republic of Nepal is the head of Malaysia's diplomatic mission to Nepal. The position has the rank and status of an Ambassador Extraordinary and Plenipotentiary and is based in the Embassy of Malaysia, Kathmandu.

List of heads of mission

Chargés d'Affaires to Nepal

Ambassadors to Nepal

See also
 Malaysia–Nepal relations

References 

 
Nepal
Malaysia